Desert Gold is a 1926 American silent Western film directed by George B. Seitz. According to silentera.com the film survives while Arne Andersen Lost Film Files has it as a lost film. Portions of the film were shot near Palm Springs, California.

Plot
As described in a film magazine review, George Thorne is a young army lieutenant at a border post. He is in love with Mercedes Castanada who, in the lawless life about the fort, is always in danger of falling into the hands of Snake Landree's bandit gang that is the terror of the region. Into the life of the post comes Dick Gale, a man from the East who is soon engaged in a battle for the heart of the girl, whom he has quickly come to love. He aids her in a battle with the desperados. They escape onto the desert and are lost in a sandstorm. They are rescued by the lieutenant, whom, the young woman confesses to the other man, she loves. The Easterner accepts his defeat in the struggle for her affections.

Cast

References

External links

1926 films
1926 Western (genre) films
American black-and-white films
Films based on American novels
Films based on Western (genre) novels
Films directed by George B. Seitz
Films shot in California
Films based on works by Zane Grey
Silent American Western (genre) films
1920s American films
1920s English-language films